Rain song refers to:
 Rain Song (al-Sayyab), Arabic poetry collection and the title poem by Iraqi poet al-Sayyab, 1960 
 "The Rain Song", a song by the rock band Led Zeppelin
 "Rain Song" (Taiji song), a 2000 song by Japanese musician Taiji
 RainSong, a US-based acoustic guitar manufacturer
 Rain dancing, a ceremony to ensure seasonal rains vital to the harvest
"Rain Song", a 2021 song from the soundtrack to Minari by Emile Mosseri

See also
 Rain (disambiguation)#Songs